Instituto Atlético Central Córdoba, commonly known as Instituto, is a basketball team based in Córdoba, Argentina. The team plays its home games at the Angel Sandrin, which has a capacity for 2,000 people. Instituto plays in the Liga Nacional de Básquet (LNB) and won its first championship in 2022.

After promoting from the La Liga Argentina de Básquet in 2015, Instituo has played in the LNB since. Instituo has won one LNB championship, in 2022 and were runners-up once, in 2018. At the international level, they have reached the semi-finals of the Basketball Champions League Americas in 2020.

Honours

National competitions
Liga Nacional de Básquet
Champions (1): 2021–22
Runners-up (1): 2018–19

La Liga Argentina de Básquet
Winners (1): 2014–15

International competititons
BCL Americas
Semifinalist (1): 2019–20

Players

Current roster
As of 2 February 2023.

References

Basketball teams in Argentina
Sport in Córdoba, Argentina
1918 establishments in Argentina
Basketball teams established in 1918